The 2024 United States presidential election in Washington is scheduled to take place on Tuesday, November 5, 2024, as part of the 2024 United States elections in which all 50 states plus the District of Columbia will participate. Washington voters will choose electors to represent them in the Electoral College via a popular vote. The state of Washington has 12 electoral votes in the Electoral College, following reapportionment due to the 2020 United States census in which the state neither gained nor lost a seat.

Incumbent Democratic president Joe Biden has stated that he intends to run for reelection to a second term.

Primary election

Republican primary

The Washington Republican primary is scheduled to be held on March 12, 2024, alongside primaries in Hawaii, Idaho, Mississippi, and Missouri.

General election

Polling
Joe Biden vs. Donald Trump

See also 
 United States presidential elections in Washington (state)
 2024 United States presidential election
 2024 Democratic Party presidential primaries
 2024 Republican Party presidential primaries
 2024 United States elections

Notes

References 

Washington
2024
Presidential